Aşağıovacık (literally "little lower plains" or "below are little plains") is a Turkish place name that may refer to the following places in Turkey:

 Aşağıovacık, Gerede, a village in the district of Gerede, Bolu Province
 Aşağıovacık, Hamamözü, a village in the district of Gümüşhacıköy, Amasya Province
 Aşağıovacık, Karakoçan
 Aşağıovacık, Kızılırmak